Warburton is a town in Victoria, Australia,  east of Melbourne's central business district, located within the Shire of Yarra Ranges local government area.

History

The name "Warburton" has been shared between two townships over the years. The mining town of "Yankee Jim's Creek" was located on the gold-bearing slopes of Mount Little Joe. Hostile terrain, fire, drought, flood, steep slopes, unsustainable roads, crime and easier pickings for miners further upstream put an end to "Old Warburton". Land was surveyed and sold in the valley below in 1884.

The Post Office opened around 1884. Two earlier offices named Warburton were renamed as Launching Place and Hoddle's Creek.

Warburton was connected to Lilydale by a Victorian Railways branch line, which was closed in 1965. The railway path is now used for the Lilydale to Warburton Rail Trail, a rail trail used by pedestrians, cyclists, and horse-riders.

East of Warburton is a large water catchment area called Upper Yarra Dam, which is designed to supply Melbourne with water sourced from the Thomson catchment area. Robert Hoddle first surveyed this area in 1845 after persistent overwhelming floods impeded the development of the city of Melbourne.

Warburton was named after the middle name of unpopular goldfields Police Magistrate for Castlemaine, Charles Warburton Carr by District Surveyor Clement Hodgkinson during the 1860s. It received an official title in 1884.  Hodgkinson became Australia's Father of Forestry.  Carr was confronted with a population explosion upon opening of the Yarra goldfields in 1859 amid economic depression and was honoured for dutiful administration of the law despite public protests against him.  Carr was also Secretary to the Government Inquiry into the Eureka Stockade 3 December 1854 at Ballarat. Charles Warburton Carr never lived in Warburton, he lived in Avoca.

Hodgkinson's good friend, Gold Commissioner for Bendigo and Magistrate for the Yarra Valley, Joseph Panton, named Mt Donna Buang above Warburton in 1865.  The sketch map of the upper Yarra water and new bridle track to Woods Point, from Lillydale to Traveller's rest on great mountain road, lithographed at Office of Lands and Survey, 11 Sept. 1865, is available online at the State Library of Victoria.  In a letter to The Argus 1 July 1911, Panton stated, "having ascertained from the chief and head of the aboriginal tribe of the Yering valley that the mountain was known as 'Donna Buang' I at once entered that name. My map was published by the Crown Lands department on the original scale of two miles to the inch." Panton was Colonel Anderson's nephew; both good friends with Melbourne Botanic Gardens creator Baron Von Mueller and Hodgkinson.

The last major town before Warburton, Lilydale, has similar polar histories, an evidence base that shows that Hodgkinson named the town after Lilly de Castella, daughter of Lieutenant-Colonel Joseph Anderson who served as one of the first nominated members of the Victorian Legislative Assembly in the 1850s, and another history, proposes it was named by public servant clerk John Hardy who heard convicts singing when building a road. The town attracted the wealth of Federation tourism at the turn of the 20th century. It was a honeymoon town.

Sport
Golfers play at the course of the Warburton Golf Club on Dammans Road.

Together with its neighbouring township Millgrove, Warburton has an Australian Rules football team (Warburton Millgrove) competing in the Yarra Valley Mountain District Football League.

Notable people
 Jon Johanson (1956–), aviator
 Lindsay Thompson (1923–2008), politician
 Diana Trask (1940–), country singer
 Timothy James Webb (1967–), artist

See also
 Warburton railway station

References

External links

 WarburtonInfo - Since 2009 - Over 500 pages of Community, Tourism and Mt Donna Buang Snow Information)
 The Official website Visit Warburton - Warburton Valley Community and  Economic Development Association (CEDA)

Towns in Victoria (Australia)
Mining towns in Victoria (Australia)
Yarra Valley
Yarra Ranges